Small-scale sewage pumping is normally done by a submersible pump.

This became popular in the early 1960s, when a guide rail system was developed to lift the submersible pump out of the pump station for repair, and ended the dirty and sometimes dangerous task of sending people into the sewage or wet pit. Growth of the submersible pump for sewage pumping since has been dramatic, as an increasing number of specifiers and developers learned of their advantages.

Three classes of submersible pumps exist:
Larger submersible pumps, handle  and larger solids and normally have a minimum of  discharge. They are generally used in municipal and industrial applications for pumping sewage and all types of industrial waste water.
Submersible chopper pumps, which are used to handle larger concentrations of solids and/or tougher solids that conventional sewage pumps cannot handle.  Chopper pumps are generally used in municipal and industrial waste water applications and provide clog-free operation by macerating those solids that might clog other types of submersible pumps.

Submersible pumps are normally used in a packaged pump station where drainage by gravity is not possible.

Vertical type sewage pumps have also been used for many years.

See also
Sewage treatment
Pumping station
Packaged pump station
Submersible pump
Chopper pumps
 Submersible pump cable
 Booster pump

References

Sewerage infrastructure